A railroad car, railcar (American and Canadian English), railway wagon, railway carriage, railway truck, railwagon, railcarriage or railtruck (British English  and UIC), also called a train car, train wagon, train carriage or train truck, is a vehicle used for the carrying of cargo or passengers on a rail transport network (a railroad/railway). Such cars, when coupled together and hauled by one or more locomotives, form a train. Alternatively, some passenger cars are self-propelled in which case they may be either single railcars or make up multiple units.

The term "car" is commonly used by itself in American English when a rail context is implicit. Indian English sometimes uses "bogie" in the same manner, though the term has other meanings in other variants of English. In American English, "railcar" is a generic term for a railway vehicle; in other countries "railcar" refers specifically to a self-propelled, powered, railway vehicle.

Although some cars exist for the railroad's own use – for track maintenance purposes, for example – most carry a revenue-earning load of passengers or freight, and may be classified accordingly as passenger cars or coaches on the one hand or freight cars (or wagons) on the other.

Passenger cars 

Passenger cars, or coaches, vary in their internal fittings:

In standard-gauge railway cars, seating is usually configured into ranges from three to five seats across the width of the car, with an aisle in between (resulting in arrangements of 2+1, 2+2 or 3+2 seats) or at the side. Tables may be provided between seats facing one another. Alternatively, seats facing in the same direction may have access to a fold-down ledge on the back of the seat in front.

 If the aisle is located between seats, seat rows may face the same direction, or be grouped, with twin rows facing each other.
 In some vehicles intended for commuter services, seats are positioned with their backs to the side walls, either on one side or more commonly on both, facing each other across the aisle. This gives a wide accessway and allows room for standing passengers at peak times, as well as improving loading and unloading speeds.
 If the aisle is at the side, the car is usually divided into small compartments. These usually contain six seats, although sometimes in second class they contain eight, and sometimes in first class they contain four.

Passenger cars can take the electricity supply for heating and lighting equipment from either of two main sources: directly from a head-end power generator on the locomotive via bus cables, or by an axle-powered generator which continuously charges batteries whenever the train is in motion.

Modern cars usually have either air conditioning or windows that can be opened (sometimes, for safety, not so far that one can hang out), or sometimes both. Various types of onboard train toilet facilities may also be provided.

Other types of passenger car exist, especially for long journeys, such as the dining car, parlor car, disco car, and in rare cases theater and movie theater car. In some cases another type of car is temporarily converted to one of these for an event.

Observation cars were built for the rear of many famous trains to allow the passengers to view the scenery. These proved popular, leading to the development of dome cars multiple units of which could be placed mid-train, and featured a glass-enclosed upper level extending above the normal roof to provide passengers with a better view.

Sleeping cars outfitted with (generally) small bedrooms allow passengers to sleep through their night-time trips, while couchette cars provide more basic sleeping accommodation.  Long-distance trains often require baggage cars for the passengers' luggage. In European practice it used to be common for day coaches to be formed of compartments seating 6 or 8 passengers, with access from a side corridor. In the UK, Corridor coaches fell into disfavor in the 1960s and 1970s partially because open coaches are considered more secure by women traveling alone.

Another distinction is between single- and double deck train cars. An example of a double decker is the Amtrak superliner.

A "trainset" (or "set") is a semi-permanently arranged formation of cars, rather than one created "ad hoc" out of whatever cars are available. These are only broken up and reshuffled 'on shed' (in the maintenance depot). Trains are then built of one or more of these 'sets' coupled together as needed for the capacity of that train.

Often, but not always, passenger cars in a train are linked together with enclosed, flexible gangway connections through which passengers and crewmen can walk. Some designs incorporate semi-permanent connections between cars and may have a full-width connection, effectively making them one long, articulated 'car'. In North America, passenger cars also employ tightlock couplings to keep a train together in the event of a derailment or other accident.

Many multiple unit trains consist of cars which are semi-permanently coupled into sets: these sets may be joined together to form larger trains, but generally passengers can only move around between cars within a set. This "closed" arrangement keeps parties of travellers and their luggage together, and hence allows the separate sets to be easily split to go separate ways. Some multiple-unit trainsets are designed so that corridor connections can be easily opened between coupled sets; this generally requires driving cabs either set to the side or (as in the Dutch Koploper or the Japanese 285 series) above the passenger compartment. These cabs or driving trailers are also useful for quickly reversing the train.

Passenger car gallery

Freight cars 

Freight cars (US/Canada), goods wagons (UIC), or trucks (UK) exist in a wide variety of types, adapted to carry a host of goods. Originally there were very few types of cars; the flat car or wagon, and the boxcar (US/Canada), covered wagon (UIC) or van (UK), were among the first.

Types of freight cars 
Freight cars or goods wagons are generally categorized as follows:
 Boxcar (US and Canada), covered wagon (UIC) or van (UK): fully enclosed car with side or end doors. Standard boxcars have about 3.5 times the capacity of a standard Semi-trailer.
 Covered wagon (UIC), van (UK) or boxcar (US/Canada): fully enclosed wagon for moisture-susceptible goods.
 Hicube boxcars: high-capacity high-clearance boxcar
 Refrigerator car or reefer (US/Canada): refrigerated boxcar for fruits and vegetables.
 CargoBeamer
 Coil car: specialized flat or gondola for heavy sheet metal rolls
 Combine car: combined passenger car and boxcar in one wagon
 Flatcar (or flat): for larger bulky loads.  Specialized flat cars include:
 Aircraft Parts Car: with fixtures for large aircraft parts.
 Autorack (also called auto carriers): multi-level flat for automobiles.
 Centerbeam cars (US): specialized flat for building materials.
 Conflat (UK): specialized flat for containers.
 CargoSprinter: self-propelled container flat.
 Container flatcar
 Depressed-center flatcar or Wellcar or Lowmac (UK): for high-clearance loads (e.g. transformers and boilers)
 Semi-trailer flatcar
 Rolling highway: a train designed to carry trucks and/or semi-trailers
 Single container car; Spine car, a center sill and side sill only car with lateral arms to support intermodal containers. See also Well car.
 Double container car; Well car or double-stack car. Cars for transporting Intermodal containers with a low deck to allow double stacking, commonly used in articulated form. See also Spine car
 Schnabel car: for unusually large and heavy industrial equipment (transformers, boilers, reactors, distillation columns,...)
 Gondola (US): car with open top, enclosed sides and ends for bulk goods.
 Covered hopper: specialized hopper car with a cover for weather sensitive loads (grain, pellets,...)
 Open wagon (UIC): railway wagon with an open top but enclosed sides and ends, for bulk commodities and other goods that might slide off.
 Hoppers: similar to gondolas but with bottom dump doors for easy unloading of things like coal, ore, grain, cement, ballast and the like.  Short hoppers for carrying iron ore are called ore jennies in the US.
 Lorry (US/Canada): An open wagon (UIC) or gondola (US/Canada) with a tipping trough, often found in mines. See also Tippler.
 Mine car
 Mine cart (e.g., V skip wagon).
 Side dump cars: used to transport roadbed materials such as, ballast, riprap, and large stone, and are able to unload anywhere along the track.
 Tippler (UK): An open wagon with no doors or roof which are unloaded by being inverted on a Wagon Tippler (UK) or Rotary car dumper (US/Canada). They are, used for minerals, such as coal, limestone and iron ore as well as other bulk cargo. See also Lorry.
 Quarry tub: a type of small railway or tramway wagon used in quarries for the transport minerals, such as coal, limestone and iron ore.
 Modalohr Road Trailer Carriers.
 Presflo and Prestwin (UK), bulk cement wagons 
 Roll-block: a train designed to carry another railway train
 Slate wagon: specialized freight cars used to transport slate
 Stock car: ventilated box car for livestock
 Tank car (US/Canada), tank wagon (UIC) or tanker: for liquid or gas.
 British milk tank wagon
 Milk car: specialized tank car for milk
 Tank cars for bulk loading
 "Whale Belly" car: high capacity tank car with a "belly".
 Transporter wagon: a wagon designed to carry other railway equipment.
 Well car

Common Freight Car Underframe Components (North America) 
Freight cars, as share in the above section, vary in appearance by the intended end use. The underframe components or running gear is similar between all car types to boost reliability and lower the railcar cost. The major parts groups follow and are regulated by the Federal Railroad Administration (US) and Transport Canada (Canada).

 Centersill or Sidesill
 Trucks
 Wheels
 Brake rigging (Foundation brake gear)
 Couplers

Freight car gallery

Aluminium cars 
The first two main-line all aluminum passenger cars were exhibited at the 1933-35 Chicago World's Fair by Pullman Company. Aluminum freight cars have a higher net-to-tare ratio of 4.9 than traditional steel based wagons, which have 3.65.

Non-revenue cars 

 Ballast regulator
 Ballast tamper
 Barrier vehicle or match wagon, with a different coupler at each end.
 Caboose (US) or Brake van (UIC) attach to rear to watch freight trains, assist in reverse moves, and provide rear braking. Replaced by End-Of-Train devices.
 Catenary maintenance vehicle or tower car, used to maintain overhead lines
 Clearance car, special car to check for obstructions.
 Crew car aka outfit car or a camp car, bunkhouse car a bunk, kitchen, or tool car for railroad employees.
 Departmental vehicle
 Handcars, early MOW car powered by passengers with a handcrank.
 Maintenance of way (MOW) cars for maintaining track and equipment.
 Office car which contains a mobile office for a train company.
 Rail ambulance
 Rail car mover similar to HiRail trucks.
 Railroad cranes
 Railway post office
 Road-rail vehicle
 Scale test car
 Track geometry car
 Track tester

Military cars 

Military armoured trains use several types of specialized cars:

 Anti-air: equipped with anti-air guns
 Anti-tank: equipped with anti-tank guns, usually in a tank gun turret
 Artillery: fielding mixture of guns and machine guns
 Command: similar to infantry wagons, but designed to be a train command center
 DODX is the reporting mark for the United States Department of Defense Military Traffic Management Command. 
 Infantry: fielding machine guns, designed to carry infantry units
 Machine gun: dedicated to machine guns
 Platform: unarmoured, with purposes ranging from transport of ammunition or vehicles, through track repair or derailing protection of railroad ploughs for railroad destruction.
 Troop sleepers

Mobile missile systems 

During the Cold War, the Soviet Union fielded a number of trains that served as mobile missile silos. These trains carried the missile and everything necessary to launch, and were kept moving around the railway network to make them difficult to find and destroy in a first-strike attack. A similar rail-borne system was proposed in the United States of America for the LGM-30 Minuteman in the 1960s, and the Peacekeeper Rail Garrison in the 1980s, but neither were deployed.

Radar bomb scoring
The Strategic Air Command's 1st Combat Evaluation RBS "Express" deployed from Barksdale Air Force Base with radar bomb scoring units mounted on military railroad cars with supporting equipment, to score simulated thermonuclear bombing of cities in the continental United States.

See also 

 Air brake
 Great Western Railway wagons
 List of railway vehicles
 List of rolling stock manufacturers
 Rail car tracking device
 Railway brakes
 Rolling stock
 Skytop Lounge
 Tamping machine
 Tender
 Tram
 Types of goods wagon
 UIC classification of goods wagons
 Vacuum brake

Notes

Footnotes

Citations

Further reading

External links 
 List of railroad car manufacturers by country 
 History of the Ralston Steel Car Company, Columbus, Ohio
 Paquette Railway Solutions, dealing with rolling stock and power
 US Air Force Guard Car G-50 Strategic Air Command guard car, rebuilt from Army 1943 troop kitchen car #8750. Photographed in Portola, California at the Western Pacific Railroad Museum.
 Peacekeeper Rail Garrison Car.
 Rail car manufacturing
 Guide to railroad cars

Railroad car